St. Philip's Episcopal Church is a historic Episcopal church located at 204 West 134th Street, between Adam Clayton Powell Jr. Boulevard and Frederick Douglass Boulevard in the Harlem neighborhood of Manhattan, New York City. Its congregation was founded in 1809 by free African Americans worshiping at Trinity Church, Wall Street as the Free African Church of St. Philip. First located in the notorious Five Points neighborhood, it is the oldest black Episcopal parish in New York City. Historically, it was extremely influential both while located in lower Manhattan and as an institution in Harlem, and many of its members have been leaders in the black community. In 2020, it reported 188 members, 111 average attendance, and plate and pledge income of $224,827.

History

Previous buildings
The first church foundation stone was laid in 1819, and the first rector, serving from 1826 to 1840, was the Rev. Peter Williams, Jr., a leading abolitionist and the first African-American Episcopal priest in New York. He was one of three blacks who served on the first executive committee of the American Anti-Slavery Society. In the 1820s other men in the church were also upwardly mobile, beginning to gain financial success primarily in the service industry and joining abolitionist and other reform groups. They stressed education and promoted "character, respectability, and uplift." In the following decades Black Episcopalians continued to build on their church connections, with some creating a niche in marine trades, where white Episcopalians owned ships and served as captains. Some achieved professional status as teachers and doctors, and others had businesses as grocers and restaurateurs.

The first two sites were located on 122 Centre Street. In 1822, a brick building replaced the original wood frame church, which had been damaged by fire. It was renovated twice because of damage suffered in social unrest. In 1834 the church was vandalized by whites. During the American Civil War, it suffered damage by New York City police using it as a barracks for militia and police during the 1863 New York City draft riots. Many ethnic Irish attacked blacks on the street and their institutions during this riot.

Demographic changes continued as New York expanded and the city developed uptown. New waves of immigrants settled in the oldest housing, and more established residents moved north along the island. Along with its congregation, St. Philip's relocated uptown, by 1886 having a site on 25th Street. It sold this property c.1909 for $600,000. With this money it bought the site of the current church, as well as 10 apartment buildings on West 135th Street in Harlem. This area had previously been restricted to whites only. Some moved beyond the city limits into the developing railroad suburbs.  The reredos of the current church came from the church on 25th Street.

Like many other churches, St. Philip's had considerable stability in its leadership through the mid-20th century. Rev. Hutchens C. Bishop was rector for 47 years, from 1886 until 1933. Bishop's son, Shelton Hale Bishop, served as rector from 1933-1957.

Current building
The present church building was designed by architects Vertner Woodson Tandy and George Washington Foster of the firm Tandy & Foster. Both were prominent African-American architects: Tandy was the first African-American architect licensed to practice in New York State and Foster was among the first licensed by the State of New Jersey. The church was built in 1910-1911 in the Neo-Gothic style.

The church was designated as a New York City Landmark in 1993, and was added to the National Register of Historic Places in 2008.

Parishioners
Notable parishioners of St. Philip's include, in the 19th century: Thomas Jennings, Thomas Downing, his son George T. Downing, Dr. James McCune Smith, and Alexander Crummell. In the 20th century, such political and cultural leaders as professor and public intellectual W. E. B. Du Bois; Thurgood Marshall, NAACP Legal Defense Fund attorney and Supreme Court Justice; and poet and playwright Langston Hughes were also members of the church.

See also
List of New York City Landmarks
National Register of Historic Places listings in New York County, New York
Lafargue Clinic, a mental health clinic that operated in the church basement from 1946 to 1958

References 
Notes

Further reading
Hewitt, John H. ''Protest and Progress: New York's First Black Episcopal Church Fights Racism, Taylor & Francis, 2000

External links

 Official site

African-American history in New York City
Churches in Harlem
Properties of religious function on the National Register of Historic Places in Manhattan
Gothic Revival church buildings in New York City
Episcopal church buildings in New York City
Religious organizations established in 1809
Churches completed in 1910
20th-century Episcopal church buildings
19th-century Episcopal church buildings
Demolished churches in New York City
Demolished buildings and structures in Manhattan
Five Points, Manhattan
Harlem
1809 establishments in New York (state)
New York City Designated Landmarks in Manhattan